The Verbier Festival is an annual international music festival that takes place for two weeks in late July and early August in the mountain resort of Verbier, Switzerland.

Founded by Swedish expatriate  in 1994, it has attracted international soloists such as Piotr Anderszewski, Leif Ove Andsnes, Martha Argerich, Lera Auerbach, Emanuel Ax, Sergei Babayan, Khatia Buniatishvili, Seong-Jin Cho (2018), Hilary Hahn, Leonidas Kavakos, Evgeny Kissin, Magdalena Kožená, Lang Lang, Mischa Maisky, Mikhail Pletnev, Lawrence Power, Thomas Quasthoff, Julian Rachlin, Andrea Rost, Anoushka Shankar, András Schiff, Bryn Terfel, Daniil Trifonov, Yuja Wang, Julian Lloyd Webber, Gautier Capuçon, and Renaud Capuçon.

The Verbier Festival is also nurturing young musicians with its Academy and three orchestras: the Verbier Festival Orchestra, the Verbier Festival Chamber Orchestra and the Verbier Festival Junior Orchestra (formerly known as the Verbier Festival Music Camp Orchestra).

Activities of the Fest'Off, including jazz concerts and special walks in the environs of Verbier, are also available to the public for free during the 17 days of the festival.

References

External links

Verbier Festival on medici.tv

Music festivals established in 1994
Classical music festivals in Switzerland
Tourist attractions in Valais
Bagnes
Summer events in Switzerland